Cover Up is an American action/adventure television series that aired for one season on CBS from September 22, 1984, to April 6, 1985. Created by Glen A. Larson, the series stars Jennifer O'Neill, Jon-Erik Hexum, Antony Hamilton, and Richard Anderson.

Plot 
Fashion photographer Dani Reynolds's life suddenly changes after the death of her husband. That's when she discovers that he was actually an undercover CIA agent. When she learns he had been murdered, she recruits Mac Harper, a former Special Forces Operator, to help her find her husband's killers.

Henry Towler, her husband's boss, then offers her the dead husband's job. Dani would pretend she was still a photographer and Mac would be her model. Henry would send them anywhere in the world where Americans are in trouble or criminals need to be caught. Once there, they act pretty much on their own.

After the death of actor Jon-Erik Hexum, who played Mac, the episode "Writer's Block" introduced Dani's new assistant, Jack Striker. Jack was a CIA agent who, like Mac, operated under the cover of a model.

At the end of the episode "Writer's Block", they explained that Mac was not coming back and ran the following message that replaced the closing credits:

"When a star dies, its light continues to shine across the universe for ... died in October of this year... but the lives he touched will continue to be brightened by his light... forever... and ever..."

Cast 
 Jennifer O'Neill as Dani Reynolds
 Jon-Erik Hexum as Mac Harper
 Antony Hamilton as Jack Striker
 Richard Anderson as Henry Towler

Production

On-set accident
During a break between scenes on the set on Friday, October 12, 1984, Jon-Erik Hexum became bored with the filming delays. He began playing Russian roulette with what he believed was a harmless .44 Magnum prop gun and jokingly placed it to his temple and pulled the trigger. The shot sent the wadding from the blank cartridge into Hexum's skull, driving a bone fragment the size of a quarter into his brain and causing massive hemorrhaging. Hexum was rushed to the hospital, where he was declared brain dead nearly a week later. On October 18, he was taken off life support.

Hexum appeared in only eight episodes of the series, including the pilot. He was replaced by Antony Hamilton for the remainder of the season. Jennifer O'Neill appeared in all of the episodes. As Cover Up continued to air throughout the winter of 1984–85, ratings held up. The network ultimately canceled the series after its first season due to mediocre ratings.

Episode list

References

External links 

1984 American television series debuts
1985 American television series endings
1980s American drama television series
American action television series
CBS original programming
English-language television shows
Espionage television series
Television series by 20th Century Fox Television
Television series created by Glen A. Larson
American action adventure television series
Television shows set in Fairfax County, Virginia
Television shows set in Virginia